Éric Poulliat (born 9 July 1974) is a French politician of La République En Marche! (LREM) who has been serving as a member of the National Assembly since the 2017 elections, representing the department of Gironde.

Political career
A native of Bordeaux, Poulliat is a former member of the Socialist Party (2005–2014). He served as chief of staff to the Mayor of Saint-Médard-en-Jalles from 2008 to 2014.

In parliament, Poulliat serves on the Committee on Cultural Affairs and Education. From 2017 until 2019, he was also a member of the Committee on Legal Affairs.

Political positions
In 2019, Pouillat co-authored a parliamentarian report on the growing influence of radical Islamism in French public services, wit Éric Diard.

In July 2019, Poulliat decided not to align with his parliamentary group's majority and became one of 52 LREM members who abstained from a vote on the French ratification of the European Union’s Comprehensive Economic and Trade Agreement (CETA) with Canada.

References

1974 births
Living people
Deputies of the 15th National Assembly of the French Fifth Republic
Socialist Party (France) politicians
La République En Marche! politicians
Politicians from Bordeaux
Bordeaux Montaigne University alumni
Deputies of the 16th National Assembly of the French Fifth Republic